Christopher Delvan Gwamna Ajiyat (born 12 December 1960) is a Nigerian gospel singer, songwriter and presiding pastor of The New Life Pastoral Centre (New Life Assembly), based in Kaduna, Nigeria and also oversees the ministerial arms such as: Arewa Christian Initiative; House of Jeduthun; Metahost Partnerships and Pisgah Media.

Life and education
Gwamna was born in Kagoro, Kaduna State, Nigeria on 12 December 1960. He graduated from Ahmadu Bello University in the 1980s with a bachelor's degree in history and political science. Gwamna and his wife, Anna (also a pastor), gave birth to two children, Joel and Salamatu.

Musical and clerical career
Gwamna has travelled many parts of the world since the beginning of his musical career and has been featured in programmes such the inter-denominational carnival of praise and Worship that was held in Tafawa Balewa Square, Lagos, organized by Omegabank Plc. on 12 May 2001.

He was one of the officiating ministers at the Men of Issachar Vision's conference, led by the Nigerian Vice President, Yemi Osinbajo, in Ibadan in January 2017, as reported by The Cable.

In 2018, he was listed by YNaija as one of the 100 Most Influential People in Christian Ministry in Nigeria.

Achievements and awards
Gwamna participated in the translation of the Revised Standard Version into Hausa language, for the Bible League of the United States of America and successfully completed the project in 2003.

Gwamna received Fellow's Investiture and Icon of Mentorship Award on 26 April 2017 from Institute of Mentoring and Career Coaching Nigeria (IMCCN) in recognition of "his spiritual leadership, mentorship and sacrifice to humanity" at Koinonia Cultural Development Centre of the New Life Pastoral Centre in Kaduna, presented to him by the director-general of the institute, Rotimi Matthew.

Discography
 "I'll Lead the Earth"
 "Little Foxes"
 "You’re My Guiding Light"
 "El-Elohe Israel"
 "He's the Lamb, He's the Lion"
 "You are Glorious"
 "I Will Follow"
 "I Will Sing"
 "Out of the Ashes"
 "Take Me Deeper"
 "The Lord is my Light"
 "Until Shiloh"
 "You are the Holy Ghost"
"Bringing Everything In Obedience to Christ"

Videography
 "Holy Holy Holy Latest" (Nigeria Gospel Song)
 "Glorious Life Songs"
 "Narration"
 "I Will Sing"
 "Word & Worship Conference 2018"

Popular quotes

References

External links
 Chris Delvan Top 50 Songs

Nigerian musicians
People from Kaduna State
Nigerian gospel singers
Nigerian clergy
Living people
Atyap people
1960 births